Greg Lake is the debut studio album by English rock singer and guitarist Greg Lake, released in the United Kingdom on 25 September 1981 by Chrysalis Records.

The album

Background
In contrast to the progressive rock of King Crimson and Emerson, Lake & Palmer, the groups which Lake had been member of, this album is characterized by a guitar-driven straightforward hard rock sound. The change in musical style is explained by his desire to perform as a guitarist rather than playing bass.

To record the album, Lake teamed up with a string of prominent musicians, including Gary Moore, Clarence Clemons, and Toto members Steve Lukather, David Hungate and Jeff Porcaro. Moore played a major role including writing the song, "Nuclear Attack". In 1993, when the album was finally released on CD (in Japan), it was re-titled Greg Lake & Gary Moore.

Reception
Marc Loren has given Greg Lake a retrospective rating of three stars out of five on AllMusic. He has described it as a "powerful and enjoyable album", which contains "well written songs and some sizzling guitar work by Gary Moore", and has praised Lake's production skills.

Greg Lake charted in the United Kingdom and the United States, reaching the same number 62 spot in both countries. Several songs were released as singles in different territories. "Let Me Love You Once Before You Go", a cover of the 1977 song written by Steve Dorff and Molly Ann Leikin for Dusty Springfield, was issued in the United States and peaked at number 48 on the Billboard Hot 100. "Nuclear Attack" was a minor radio hit and reached number 34 on the Mainstream Rock chart.

Track listing

Personnel
 Greg Lake – vocals, rhythm guitar, production
 Gary Moore – lead guitar
 Tristram Margetts – bass
 Tommy Eyre – keyboards
 Ted McKenna – drums

Additional musicians
 Steve Lukather – guitars
 Dean Parks – guitars
 Snuffy Walden – guitars
 David Hungate – bass
 Bill Cuomo – keyboards
 Greg Mathieson – keyboards
 Clarence Clemons – saxophone
 Willie Cochrane – pipe
 David Milner – pipe
 Michael Giles – drums
 Jode Leigh – drums
 Jeff Porcaro – drums

Technical personnel
 Alex Grobb – producer (on "It Hurts")
 Haydn Bendall – engineer
 Brian Robson – engineer
 Ian Short – engineer
 Paul Dobbe – engineer
 Harold Blumberg – engineer
 John Timperley – engineer
 Nigel Walker – engineer
 Tony Benyon – cover concept
 John Pasche – art direction

Charts

References

Greg Lake albums
1981 debut albums
Chrysalis Records albums
Albums produced by Greg Lake